Penicillium marinum is a species in the genus Penicillium which produces patulin and roquefortine C.

Further reading

References

marinum
Fungi described in 2004